Siraag Abrahams (born July 3, 1982) is a South African cricketer, who played for Easterns and Titan, amongst others in first-class and List A cricket.

References 

Living people
1982 births
South African cricketers
Easterns cricketers